This is a list of Live with Regis and Kelly episodes which were broadcast during the show's 19th season.  The list is ordered by air date.

Although the co-hosts may have read a couple of emails during the broadcast, it does not necessarily count as a "Regis and Kelly Inbox" segment.

September 2006

October 2006

November 2006

December 2006

January 2007

February 2007

March 2007

April 2007

May 2007

June 2007

July 2007

August 2007

See also
 Live with Regis and Kelly (season 18)
 Live with Regis and Kelly (season 20)
 Live with Regis and Kelly (season 21)
 Live with Regis and Kelly (season 22)

References

2006 American television seasons
2007 American television seasons